James Milner, 1st Baron Milner of Leeds,  (12 August 1889 – 16 July 1967), was a British Labour Party politician.

Biography
Milner was educated at the University of Leeds and became a solicitor. He was a major in World War I and was wounded, awarded the Military Cross and bar for his service. He was a Leeds City Councillor and Deputy Lord Mayor of Leeds in 1928, and was also Chairman of Leeds Labour Party and President of Leeds Law Society. He later became deputy-lieutenant of the West Riding of Yorkshire.

He was elected as the Labour Member of Parliament (MP) for Leeds South East at a by-election in August 1929, and served until 1951. He became Chairman of Ways and Means and Deputy Speaker and led the British Group of the Inter-Parliamentary Union. He was made a Privy Counsellor in 1945.

In 1951, the Speaker of the House of Commons, Douglas Clifton Brown, had stepped down. As Chairman of Ways and Means, Milner wanted to be Labour's first-ever Speaker. However, the Conservatives, now the majority party, nominated William Morrison. The vote went along party lines – the first time the post had been contested in the 20th century – and Milner lost.
As some compensation, he was elevated to the House of Lords as Baron Milner of Leeds, of Roundhay in the City of Leeds, on 20 December 1951. Denis Healey replaced him in the subsequent by-election.

Honours
 Military Cross and Bar (MC)
 1914–15 Star
 British War Medal
 WWI Victory Medal
 Member of His Majesty's Most Honourable Privy Council (PC) (1945)
 Freedom of the City of Leeds (1967)

Marriage and children
Milner married Lois Tinsdale Brown on 10 February 1917.  They had three children:

 Hon. (Lois Elizabeth Florence) Zaidée Milner (born 9 January 1919, died 1980)
 (Arthur James) Michael Milner, 2nd Baron Milner of Leeds (born 12 September 1923, died 20 August 2003)
 Hon. Shelagh Mary Margaret Milner (born 8 March 1925)

Milner died in 1967 at the age of 77 and was succeeded in the barony by his only son, Michael.

References

Sources

External links 
 

1889 births
1967 deaths
Milner, James
Members of the Privy Council of the United Kingdom
Milner, James
Milner, James
Milner, James
Milner, James
Milner, James
Milner, James
Milner, James
Politics of Leeds
Councillors in Leeds
Labour Party (UK) hereditary peers
Barons created by George VI
1
Alumni of the University of Leeds
British Army personnel of World War I
Devonshire Regiment officers
Royal Army Service Corps officers
Recipients of the Military Cross
British solicitors
Place of birth missing